Burgeonidea is a monotypic snout moth genus described by Jean Ghesquière in 1942. Its only species, Burgeonidea meteoraula, described by Edward Meyrick in 1934, is found in Uganda.

References

Pyralinae
Monotypic moth genera
Moths of Africa
Pyralidae genera